The 2018 Greek Cup Final was the 74th final of the Greek Football Cup. It took place on 12 May 2018 at Olympic Stadium, between AEK Athens and PAOK for a second time in row. It was AEK Athens' twenty third Greek Cup Final and third consecutive, of their 94-year history and PAOK's nineteenth Greek Cup Final and second consecutive, in their 92 years of existence.

Venue

This was the twenty third Greek Cup Final held at the Athens Olympic Stadium, after the 1983, 1984, 1985, 1986, 1987, 1988, 1989, 1990, 1993, 1994, 1995, 1996, 1999, 2000, 2002, 2009, 2010, 2011, 2012, 2013, 2014, 2015 and 2016 finals.

The Athens Olympic Stadium was built in 1982 and renovated once in 2004. The stadium is used as a venue for AEK Athens and was used for Olympiacos, Panathinaikos and Greece in various occasions. Its current capacity is 69,618 and hosted 3 UEFA European Cup/Champions League Finals in 1983, 1994 and 2007, a UEFA Cup Winners' Cup Final in 1987, the 1991 Mediterranean Games and the 2004 Summer Olympics.

Background
AEK Athens qualified for the Greek Cup Final twenty two times, winning fourteen of them. They last won the Cup in 2016 defeating Olympiacos, 2–1. They last played in a Final in 2017; they had lost to PAOK, 2–1.

PAOK qualified for the Greek Cup Final eighteen times, winning five of them. They last played in a Final in 2017; they defeated AEK Athens, 2–1.

Route to the final

Match

Details

References

2018
Cup Final
Greek Cup Final 2018
Greek Cup Final 2018
Sports competitions in Athens
May 2018 sports events in Europe